Alan Beaney (3 March 1905 – 3 March 1985) was a British Labour Party politician.

Born in New Silksworth in County Durham, Beaney received an elementary education before becoming a coal miner in Yorkshire.  He joined the Labour Party, and served on Dearne Urban District Council from 1938 to 1952, and then the West Riding of Yorkshire County Council from 1949 to 1952, and again from 1958 to 1959.  The Yorkshire Miners' Association funded his study with the National Council of Labour Colleges, and he later served on its executive committee.

Beaney was elected at the 1959 general election as Member of Parliament for Hemsworth.  He held the seat at the next three general elections, and stood down at the February 1974 general election.

References

1905 births
1985 deaths
Labour Party (UK) MPs for English constituencies
National Union of Mineworkers-sponsored MPs
UK MPs 1959–1964
UK MPs 1964–1966
UK MPs 1966–1970
UK MPs 1970–1974